The Standing Committee on International Trade (CIIT) is a committee in the House of Commons of Canada. It focuses on international trade. The committee was established in the 39th Parliament, having split off from the Standing Committee on Foreign Affairs and International Trade.

Studies
Canada-Central America Four Free Trade Agreement Negotiations
Canada's Trade Policy
Canada-U.S. Trade and Investment Issues and the Security and Prosperity Partnership of North America (SPP)
Canadian International Trade Tribunal: Dumped and subsidized import and domestic producers
softwood lumber
Trade Agreement between Canada and South Korea
WTO

Membership

Subcommittees
Subcommittee on Agenda and Procedure (SCII)

References
Standing Committee on International Trade (CIIT)

International
Parliamentary committees on International Trade